Nong Phrao Ngai is one of the seven subdistricts (tambon) of Sai Noi District, in Nonthaburi Province, Thailand. Neighbouring subdistricts are (from north clockwise) Thawi Watthana, Bang Khu Rat, Ban Mai, Khlong Yong and Naraphirom. In 2020 it had a total population of 7,595 people.

Administration

Central administration
The subdistrict is subdivided into 12 administrative villages (muban).

Local administration
The whole area of the subdistrict is covered by Nong Phrao Ngai Subdistrict Administrative Organization.

References

External links
Website of Nong Phrao Ngai Subdistrict Administrative Organization

Tambon of Nonthaburi province
Populated places in Nonthaburi province